The Utrechtboog is a flyover railway line in the south-east of Amsterdam, completed in March 2006, that directly connects Utrecht and Schiphol. After completion, it reduced journey times between the two by seven minutes. Prior to its construction, passengers travelling this route were required to change trains at Duivendrecht railway station.

Rail infrastructure in the Netherlands
Rail transport in Amsterdam